Synersaga phuruaensis is a moth in the family Lecithoceridae. It is found in Thailand.

The wingspan is 16-16.5 mm. The forewings are covered evenly with dark brown scales, with an indistinct blackish round spot before the middle of the cell, and a similar plical spot placed obliquely below it and a smaller spot at the end of the cell. The hindwings are brownish grey.

Etymology 
The species name refers to the type locality.

References

Moths described in 2009
phuruaensis